Romi is a given name and may refer to:

Romi Dames (born 1979), Japanese-American actress
Romi Garduce (born 1969), Filipino mountain climber and IT Professional in Procter and Gamble Philippines
Romi Goldmuntz (1882–1960), Belgian businessman who played an essential role in the survival of the diamond business in Antwerp
Romi Mayes, Canadian-born musician
Romi Park (born 1972), Japanese-Korean actress and voice actor
Romi Ropati (born 1976), retired rugby union player best known for his time with the Highlanders Super Rugby franchise
Romi Spada, Swiss bobsledder who competed in the early 1950s

See also
Return on marketing investment
Romis

ja:Romi
ru:Romi